The Miss World Puerto Rico 2009 pageant was held on July 23, 2009 in Puerto Rico. Ivonne Orsini of San Juan, who won the title of Miss World Puerto Rico 2008 and classified as one of the semi-finalists at Miss World 2008, crowned her successor, Jennifer Colón of Bayamón, as Miss World Puerto Rico 2009, Jennifer represented Puerto Rico at Miss World 2009. In 2010, no contest was held and the 1st Runner-Up of the 2009 contest, Yara Lasanta of Barranquitas was appointed as Miss World Puerto Rico 2010 and represented Puerto Rico at Miss World 2010 where she finished in the Top 25.

Placements

Awards
The following award winners automatically advanced to become semi-finalists.

Contestants

  Barceloneta - Jaileene Cintron
  Barranquitas - Yara Liz Lasanta Santiago
  Bayamón - Jennifer Colón Alvarado
  Caguas - Glorimar Serrano
  Camuy - Carla Harrison
  Cayey - Cynthia Morales
  Corozal - Rosarito Nevarez
  Culebra - Rebecca Fernandez
  Fajardo - Yizelle Ramos
  Guayama - Krystal Ruiz
  Guaynabo - Mariselle Morales

  Hormigueros - Ashley Valentin
  Humacao - Maria Angelica Hernandez
  Isabela - Amanda Díaz Torres
  Juncos - Libni Garcia Pabellón
  Orocovis - Jennifer Ortiz
  Ponce - Azarel Nadal Torres
  Río Grande - Karen Robles
  San Juan - Veronica Santiago
  Santa Isabel - Marjorie Rodriguez
  Vega Baja - Melissa Serrano Flores
  Villalba - Dagmarie Cappiello

Crossovers
 Yara Liz Lasanta Santiago (Barranquitas) previously won Miss Puerto Rico Teenage 2001, and Miss Teen International 2001, placed 4th runner-up at Miss Puerto Rico Universe 2005, 2nd runner-up at Miss Puerto Rico Universe 2007, and 2nd runner-up in Univision's Nuestra Belleza Latina 2007.
 In 2010 the Miss Mundo de Puerto Rico Organization did not hold its annual contest, therefore Yara was appointed as the new Miss Puerto Rico World 2010'. Yara would later on represent Puerto Rico at Miss World 2010 in which she placed as a semi-finalist. Prior to the final night, Yara had won the Miss World Beach Beauty competition, which was what guaranteed her a spot in the semi-finals on the final night of the pageant.
 Amanda Díaz Torres (Isabela) previously placed 4th runner-up at Miss Puerto Rico Universe 2008 and 3rd runner-up at Miss World Puerto Rico 2004. She used to hold the title of Miss Puerto Rico International 2009 and was supposed to represent Puerto Rico at Miss International 2009 but resigned.
 Jennifer Colón Alvarado (Bayamón), Glorimar Serrano (Caguas), Rebecca Fernandez (Culebra), and Karen Robles (Río Grande) participated at Miss Puerto Rico Universe 2009. Rebecca and Karen did not place, Glorimar placed as a semi-finalist, and Jennifer placed as 1st runner-up.

References

2009 in Puerto Rico
2009
2009 beauty pageants
Beauty pageants in Puerto Rico
Miss Puerto Rico